The 1974–75 Vancouver Blazers season was the Vancouver Blazers' third season of operation in the World Hockey Association (WHA), and their second and final season in Vancouver. The Blazers failed to make the playoffs. The franchise moved to Calgary after this season and became the Cowboys.

Offseason

Regular season

Final standings

Game log

Player stats

Note: Pos = Position; GP = Games played; G = Goals; A = Assists; Pts = Points; +/- = plus/minus; PIM = Penalty minutes; PPG = Power-play goals; SHG = Short-handed goals; GWG = Game-winning goals
      MIN = Minutes played; W = Wins; L = Losses; T = Ties; GA = Goals-against; GAA = Goals-against average; SO = Shutouts;

Awards and records

Transactions

Draft picks
Vancouver's draft picks at the 1974 WHA Amateur Draft.

Farm teams

See also
1974–75 WHA season

References

External links

Van
Van